Karla Leigh Hoffman is an American operations researcher, and the former president of the Institute for Operations Research and the Management Sciences. She is a professor of systems engineering and operations research in the Volgenau School of Engineering of George Mason University. Her research has focused on practical applications of operations research and optimization to problems including transportation scheduling, airport landing slot allocation, spectrum auctions, and telecommunications budgeting.

Education and career
Hoffman graduated from Rutgers University in 1969 with a bachelor's degree in mathematics. She then studied operations research at George Washington University, earning an MBA in 1971 and completing her doctorate (D.Sc.) in 1975. Her dissertation, A Successive Underestimation Function for Concave Minimization, was directed by James E. Falk.

She became a postdoctoral researcher at the National Institute of Standards and Technology (NIST) in 1975 and remained at NIST as a mathematics researcher in the Operations Research Division until 1984, when she moved to George Mason University. She was promoted to full professor in 1989, and served as acting chair and chair of her department from 1996 to 2001, seeing it through a change of name from operations research and operations engineering to systems engineering and operations research.

She served as president of the Institute for Operations Research and the Management Sciences (INFORMS) for the 1998 term.

Recognition
In 1984, Hoffman won both the Department of Commerce Silver Medal and the inaugural Applied Research Award of the National Institute of Standards and Technology.

The Institute for Operations Research and the Management Sciences elected her as a Fellow in 2003, and gave her their George E. Kimball Medal for distinguished service to the institute and the profession in 2005. In 2009 she became the first recipient of the Harvey J. Greenberg Impact Award for Service to the INFORMS Computing Society.

In 2018, a team of researchers organized by Hoffman and working for the Federal Communications Commission on spectrum allocation won the INFORMS Franz Edelman Award for Achievement in Advanced Analytics, Operations Research, and Management Science.

References

External links
Home page

Year of birth missing (living people)
Living people
American women engineers
Operations researchers
Women systems engineers
Rutgers University alumni
George Washington University alumni
National Institute of Standards and Technology people
George Mason University faculty
Fellows of the Institute for Operations Research and the Management Sciences